The Juma-Jami Mosque, also known as the Friday Mosque, is located in Yevpatoria, Crimea. Built between 1552 and 1564, and designed by the Ottoman architect Mimar Sinan.

History
The Juma-Jami is the largest mosque of Crimea and was founded by Khan Devlet I Giray in 1552. The Khan commissioned Istanbul architect Mimar Sinan (1489–1588) to build the mosque. Sinan was the chief architect of the Ottoman Empire. He designed the Sinan Pasha Mosque  and the Şehzade Mosque in Istanbul. Construction of the Juma-Jami Mosque was a long process. At the time, Mimar Sinan was busy with construction of the Süleymaniye Mosque, in Istanbul, which was also plagued by financial difficulties due to money being spent on a war with Ivan the Terrible.

The mosque continued to be embellished and improved over time. From 1740 to 1743, the mosque was rebuilt and the main building was restored; from 1758 to 1769, the western facade of the mosque was decorated with paintings.

Photos

See also
Religion in Crimea
List of mosques in Russia
List of mosques in Europe

References

External links

Han Camii, Archnet

Mimar Sinan buildings
Mosques in Crimea
Yevpatoria
Religious buildings and structures completed in 1564
16th-century mosques
Ottoman mosques
16th-century establishments in the Crimean Khanate
1564 establishments in Europe
Cultural heritage monuments of federal significance in Crimea